The 2014 Wake Forest Demon Deacons men's soccer team will be the college's 35th season of playing organized men's college soccer, and their 35th season playing in the Atlantic Coast Conference.

Background

Roster 
As of 2014:

Competitions

Spring exhibitions

Regular season 

 Ranking indicates that week's NSCAA National Rankings

Preseason

2014 Regular season

2014 ACC Tournament

2014 NCAA Tournament
 Ranking indicates NCAA Tournament seeding.

Statistics

Transfers

In

Out

See also 

 Wake Forest Demon Deacons men's soccer
 2014 Atlantic Coast Conference men's soccer season
 2014 NCAA Division I men's soccer season
 2014 ACC Men's Soccer Tournament
 2014 NCAA Division I Men's Soccer Championship

References 

Wake Forest Demon Deacons
Wake Forest Demon Deacons men's soccer seasons
Wake Forest Demon Deacons
Wake Forest Demon Deacons